Gregory Coolidge (born Gregory Kullich; December 28, 1972) is an American writer, filmmaker, and actor who has been active in cinema, television, and animation since 1995. He grew up in Norman, Oklahoma and later graduated from the University of Oklahoma. He is best known for Employee of the Month (which he also directed), Ride Along, The Troop, The Turkey Bowl, and Wayne. He was a showrunner and executive producer with Kirk Ward, Shawn Simmons, Paul Wernick, and Rhett Reese on the YouTube Original Series, Wayne, which reached over 10 million views for its pilot episode. He also wrote and directed the R-rated feature comedy, The Turkey Bowl, starring Ryan Hansen, which was filmed in his hometown of Norman, Oklahoma and featured the famed University of Oklahoma and Dallas Cowboys coach, Barry Switzer.

Filmography

Writer:
 The Turkey Bowl  (2019)
 Wayne (2018)
 Ride Along              (2014)
 Dirty Old Men         (2012)
 The Troop               (2010)
 Coxblocker             (2009)
 Born to Rock           (2009)
 Employee of the Month  (2006)
 Sorority Boys          (2002)
 Queen for a Day        (2000)

Director:
 The Turkey Bowl  (2019)
 For Sale                    (2011)
 Coxblocker             (2011)
 The Troop              (2010)
 Employee of the Month  (2006)
 Queen for a Day        (2000)

Producer:
 The Turkey Bowl  (2019)
 Wayne           (2018)
 The Troop           (2010)
 Mancrush               (2009)
 Possums               (1998)

Actor:
 Rocket Power (2002)... Trent
 Sorority Boys (2002)... Pete
 In God We Trust (2000)... Purgatorian
 Queen for a Day (2000)... Rick
 Possums        (1998)... Jake Malloy
 Profilers        (1997)... Gabriel Vanderhorn
 Hope and Gloria    (1996)... Dale

References

External links
 

1972 births
Living people
American male film actors
American male television actors
American male voice actors
American male screenwriters
Male actors from New Jersey
American film directors